The 1980 Irish Masters was the sixth edition of the professional invitational snooker tournament, which took place from 13 to 16 February 1980. The tournament was played at Goffs in Kill, County Kildare, and featured eight professional players.

Terry Griffiths won the title for the first time, beating Doug Mountjoy 10–9 in the final. 

Dennis Taylor compiled the highest  of the tournament, 91, in his match against Alex Higgins.

Results
Results from the tournament are shown below.

Group 1

Table

Results:
Doug Mountjoy 3–0 Ray Reardon 
Doug Mountjoy 2–1 Fred Davis 
John Spencer 2–1 Ray Reardon 
Fred Davis 2–1 John Spencer
Fred Davis 2–1 Ray Reardon  
Doug Mountjoy 2–1 John Spencer

Group 2

Table

Results:
Alex Higgins 2–1 Terry Griffiths 
Alex Higgins 2–1 Cliff Thorburn 
Alex Higgins 2–1 Dennis Taylor  
Dennis Taylor 2–1 Cliff Thorburn 
Terry Griffiths 2–1 Cliff Thorburn 
Terry Griffiths 3–0 Dennis Taylor

Semi-final
 4–1 
 4–1

Final
 10–9

References

Irish Masters
Irish Masters
Irish Masters
Irish Masters